Mynydd-bach, formerly Mynyddbach is the name of an electoral ward in the City and County of Swansea, Wales.

Mynydd-bach is bounded by the wards of Morriston and Landore to the east, Cwmbwrla to the south, and Llangyfelach and Penderry to the west.

The electoral ward consists of some or all of the following areas: Clase, Clasemont, Mynydd-Bach, Park View Estate, Penfillia Estate, Treboeth, Tirdeunaw, Pinewood, Mynydd Garnlywd and Bryn Rock, in the parliamentary constituency of Swansea East.

For electoral purposes, Mynydd-bach is broken down into the polling districts of: Mynydd Garnlwyd, Bryn Rock, Treboeth, Penfilia, Tirdeunaw, Clasemont and Clase.  Mynydd-Bach returns 3 councillors to the City and County of Swansea council.

In 2022 the ward was officially renamed Mynydd-bach on the recommendation of the Welsh Language Commissioner.

2017 local council elections
Voter turnout for Mynyddbach in the 2017 local council elections was 33.53%.  The results of the election were:

2012 local council elections
Voter turnout for Mynyddbach in the 2012 local council elections was 34.9%.  The results of the election were:

References

Swansea electoral wards